The Deep Underground Support Center (DUSC) was a Strategic Air Command nuclear bunker proposal in 1962 for "a hardened command post...to withstand a 100-megaton weapon with a 0.5 n.m. CEP". Cost estimates for the SAC Control System facility increased to $200 million, and when the operational year slipped from 1965 to 1969, SAC decided in 1963 "for a long-endurance, all airborne concept instead" (Wainstein), and the JCS and OSD concurred with the DUSC project cancellation.

References

Military history of Colorado
Nuclear bunkers in the United States
Proposed installations of the United States Air Force
Installations of Strategic Air Command